Jack King (23 August 1910 – 2 March 2000) was an Australian water polo player. He competed in the men's tournament at the 1948 Summer Olympics.

References

1910 births
2000 deaths
Australian male water polo players
Olympic water polo players of Australia
Water polo players at the 1948 Summer Olympics
Place of birth missing